The 2019–20 Korisliiga season was the 80th season of the top professional basketball league in Finland. Karhu were the defending champions. On 13 March 2020, the season was ended prematurely due to the coronavirus pandemic.

Format
The eleven teams would play four teams against each one of the other teams for a total of 40 games. The eight best qualified teams would join the playoffs, the 11th qualified would play a best-of-three relegation playoff against the First Division runners-up and the last team would be directly relegated.

However, the league ended without finishing the regular season.

Teams

Lahti promoted as champion of the First Division.

Regular season

League table

Results

Relegation playoffs

|}

Finnish clubs in European competitions

References

External links
Official website

Korisliiga seasons
Finnish
Koris